Take Me Home may refer to:

Music

Albums
Take Me Home (Cher album) (1979)
Take Me Home (One Direction album) (2012)
Take Me Home (Sam Clark album) (2010)
Take Me Home (Zox album) (2003)
 Take Me Home, a 1994 album by The Bellamy Brothers
 Celtic Thunder: Take Me Home, a 2009 album by Celtic Thunder
 Take Me Home, a 2012 album by Nomfusi
 Take Me Home, a 1997 album by X-Perience

Songs
"Take Me Home" (Alexandra Stan song) (2020)
"Take Me Home" (Cash Cash song) (2013)
"Take Me Home" (Cher song) (1979)
"Take Me Home" (Jess Glynne song) (2015)
"Take Me Home" (Jess Moskaluke song) (2016)
"Take Me Home" (Phil Collins song) (1985)
"Take Me Home" (Roger Daltrey song) (1987)
"Take Me Home", by 2-4 Family from Family Business
"Take Me Home", by Aero Chord ft. Nevve
"Take Me Home", by After Midnight Project from Let's Build Something to Break
"Take Me Home", by Black Sabbath from The End
"Take Me Home", by Boys Like Girls from Crazy World
"Take Me Home", by Brother Ali from The Undisputed Truth
"Take Me Home", by Delta Goodrem, B-side of the single "In This Life"
"Take Me Home", by Dramatis from For Future Reference
"Take Me Home", by Guillemots from Red
"Take Me Home", by Hollywood Undead from Day of the Dead
"Take Me Home", by Jack Savoretti from Before the Storm
"Take Me Home", by Julian Lennon from Help Yourself
"Take Me Home", by Lacuna Coil from Delirium
"Take Me Home", by Liberty X from Being Somebody
"Take Me Home", by Little River Band from After Hours
"Take Me Home", by Loudness from Hurricane Eyes
"Take Me Home", by Midnight Red
"Take Me Home", by The Outfield from Rockeye
"Take Me Home", by Peedi Peedi
"Take Me Home", by Spice Girls, B-side of the single "Say You'll Be There"
"Take Me Home", by Terror Squad from True Story
"Take Me Home", by Tom Waits from One from the Heart
"Take Me Home", by White Lion from Return of the Pride
"Take Me Home", written by Arthur Korb and Milton Yakus
"Take Me Home", from the film For Your Eyes Only
"Take Me Home", from the film Molly and Lawless John, nominated for a Golden Globe Award for Best Original Song
"Take Me Home (Piss Off)", a song by Snuff from Tweet Tweet My Lovely

Other uses
Take Me Home (TV series), a 1989 British three-part drama series starring Keith Barron
Take Me Home (1928 film), a lost silent comedy by Marshall Neilan and starring Bebe Daniels
Take Me Home (2011 film), a romantic comedy by Sam Jaeger
Take Me Home (2016 film), a documentary short film by Abbas Kiarostami
Take Me Home (newspaper), a newspaper in Hong Kong
Take Me Home, an autobiography by John Denver, or a film based on the book

See also
"Closing Time" (Semisonic song)
"Paradise City", a song by Guns N' Roses
"Take Me Home, Country Roads", a song by John Denver
Take Me Home Tonight (disambiguation)
Take Me Home Tour (disambiguation)